Aaron's rod refers to any of the walking sticks carried by Moses's brother, Aaron, in the Torah.  The Bible tells how, along with Moses's rod, Aaron's rod was endowed with miraculous power during the Plagues of Egypt that preceded the Exodus.  There are two occasions where the Bible tells of the rod's power.

Biblical references

In the culture of the Israelites, the rod ( maṭṭeh) was a natural symbol of authority, as the tool used by the shepherd to correct and guide his flock (Psalm 23:4). Moses's rod is, in fact, cited in Exodus 4:2 as carried by him while he tended his sheep; and later (Exodus 4:20) becomes his symbol of authority over the Israelites (Psalm 2:9, Psalm 89:32, Isaiah 10:24 and 11:4, Ezekiel 20:37). The rods of both Moses and Aaron were endowed with miraculous power during the Plagues of Egypt (Exodus 7:17, 8:5, 8:16–17, 9:23, and 10:13); God commanded Moses to raise his rod over the Red Sea when it was to be parted (Exodus 14:16) and in prayer over Israel in battle (Exodus 17:9); Moses brings forth water from a stone using his rod (Exodus 17:2–6).

Aaron's rod, however, is cited twice as exhibiting miraculous power on its own, when not physically in the grasp of its owner. In Exodus 7 (Parshat Va'eira in the Torah), God sends Moses and Aaron to the Pharaoh once more, instructing Aaron that when the Pharaoh demands to see a miracle, he is to "cast down his rod" and it will become a serpent. When he does so, the Pharaoh's sorcerers counter by similarly casting down their own rods, which also become serpents, but Aaron's rod swallows them all. "The Pharaoh's heart is stubborn" and he chooses to ignore this bit of symbolic warning, and so the Plagues of Egypt ensue. Notably, this chapter begins with God telling Moses,  "Behold, I have made you as God to the Pharaoh and your brother Aaron will be your prophet." As God transmits his word through his prophets to his people, so Moses will transmit God's message through Aaron to the Pharaoh. The prophet's task was to speak God's word on God's behalf. He was God's "mouth". (Exodus 4:15–16)

In Numbers 16, Korah's rebellion against Moses's proclamation of the tribe of Levi as the priesthood has been quashed and the entire congregation's ensuing rebellion has resulted in a plague, ended only by the intercession of Moses and Aaron. In order to "stop the complaints" of the Israelites, God commands that each of the Twelve Tribes provide a rod; and only that of the tribe chosen to become priests will miraculously sprout overnight. Aaron provides his rod to represent the tribe of Levi, and "it put forth buds, produced blossoms, and bore ripe almonds" (Numbers 17:8), as an evidence of the exclusive right to the priesthood of the tribe of Levi. In commemoration of this decision it was commanded that the rod be put again "before the testimony" (Numbers 17:10).

(Hebrews 9:4) states that the rod was kept in the Ark of the Covenant.

In Rabbinical literature
The Bible ascribes similar miraculous powers to the Rod of Aaron and to the Staff of Moses (compare, for example, Exodus 4:2 et seq. and 7:9). The Haggadah goes a step further, and entirely identifies the Rod of Aaron with that of Moses. Thus, the Midrash Yelammedenu states that:

the staff with which Jacob crossed the Jordan is identical with that which Judah gave to his daughter-in-law, Tamar (Genesis 32:10, 38:18). It is likewise the holy rod with which Moses worked (Exodus 4:20, 21), with which Aaron performed wonders before Pharaoh (Exodus 7:10), and with which, finally, David slew the giant Goliath (I Samuel 17:40). David left it to his descendants, and the Davidic kings used it as a scepter until the destruction of the Temple, when it miraculously disappeared. When the Messiah comes it will be given to him for a scepter in token of his authority over the heathen.

It was made of sapphire, weighed forty seahs (a seah = 10.70 pounds), and bore the inscription דצ״ך עד״ש באח״ב, which is composed of the initials of the Hebrew names of the Ten Plagues (Tan., Waëra 8, ed. Buber).

However, according to that selfsame Jewish Encyclopedia article, the authors acknowledge that this prior reference by Buber  confuses the two rods. Later, the article states: "A later Midrash (Num. R. xviii. end) confuses the legends of the rod that blossomed with those of the rod that worked miracles, thus giving us contradictory statements. There exists a legend that Moses split a tree trunk into twelve portions, and gave one portion to each tribe."

According to this account, everything fits into place. Moses' royal staff was the regal rod that belonged to Adam, but Aaron's stick was just that.

Haggadic modification

Legend has still more to say concerning this rod. God created it in the twilight of the sixth day of Creation (Pirkei Avoth 5:9, and Mekhilta, Beshallaḥ, ed. Weiss, iv. 60), and delivered it to Adam when the latter was driven from paradise. After it had passed through the hands of Shem, Enoch, Abraham, Isaac, and Jacob successively, it came into the possession of Joseph. On Joseph's death the Egyptian nobles stole some of his belongings, and, among them, Jethro appropriated the staff. Jethro planted the staff in his garden, when its marvelous virtue was revealed by the fact that nobody could withdraw it from the ground (compare "the sword in the stone"); even to touch it was fraught with danger to life. This was because the Ineffable Name of God was engraved upon it.

When Moses entered Jethro's household he read the Name, and by means of it was able to draw up the rod, for which service Zipporah, Jethro's daughter, was given to him in marriage. Her father had sworn that she should become the wife of the man who should be able to master the miraculous rod and of no other (Pirḳe R. El. 40; Sefer ha-Yashar; Yalḳ. Exodus 168, end). It must, however, be remarked that the Mishnah (Pirkei Avoth v. 9) as yet knew nothing of the miraculous creation of Aaron's Rod, which is first mentioned by the Mekilta (l.c.) and Sifre on Deuteronomy  (Berakhot  xxxiii. 21; ed. Friedmann, p. 355).

This supposed fact of the supernatural origin of the rod explains the statement in the New Testament (Hebrews 9:4) and Tosefta, Yoma, iii. 7 (it is to be interpreted thus according to Bava Batra  14a), that Aaron's Rod, together with its blossoms and fruit, was preserved in the Ark. King Josiah, who foresaw the impending national catastrophe, concealed the Ark and its contents [Aaron's rod, vial of manna and the anointing oil placed within a hidden chamber which had been built by King Solomon] (Tosefta, Sotah, 13a); and their whereabouts will remain unknown until, in the Messianic age, the prophet Elijah shall reveal them (Mekhilta l.c.).

A later Midrash (Numbers R. xviii. end) confuses the legends of the rod that blossomed with those of the rod that worked miracles, thus giving us contradictory statements. There exists a legend that Moses split a tree trunk into twelve portions, and gave one portion to each tribe. When the Rod of Aaron produced blossoms, the Israelites could not but acknowledge the significance of the token.

Christian use

The account of the blossoming of Aaron's rod contained in Clement's first letter to the Corinthians (ep. 43) is quite in haggadic-midrashic style, and must probably be ascribed to Jewish or, more strictly speaking, Jewish-Hellenistic sources. According to that account, Moses placed upon each of the twelve staffs the corresponding seal of the head of a tribe. The doors of the sanctuary were similarly sealed, to prevent anyone from having access to the rods at night.

The miraculous flowering of the rod was also considered a type of the Incarnation of Christ and his Virgin Birth, and appears in scenes of the Annunciation to Mary.

In the Ethiopian fourteenth-century text of the Kebra Nagast, Aaron's rod is broken in three and probably a symbol of the Trinity: "The rod of Aaron which sprouted after it had become withered though no one watered it with water, and one had broken it in two places, and it became three rods being [originally only] one rod."

In modern literature 
D. H. Lawrence entitled a novel Aaron's Rod in 1922. This book describes a flautist, Aaron Sissons, and his experiences as he journeys through a Europe exhausted by the First World War. The biblical eponymous reference, with the flute representing a magic rod, is intended to be ironic.

See also 
Caduceus
Korach (the Torah reading in which Aaron's rod blooms)
Nehushtan
Ningizzida
Rod of Asclepius
Margna used by Mandaean priests

Notes

External links

Jasher 77 A history of the sapphire stick from Adam to Moses is given in the Book of Jasher.

Aaron
Book of Exodus
Hebrew Bible objects
Walking sticks
Ark of the Covenant